Patrick Anthony Conmy (born January 5, 1934) is an inactive Senior United States district judge of the United States District Court for the District of North Dakota.

Education and career

Born in Fargo, North Dakota, Conmy received a Bachelor of Arts degree from Harvard College in 1955 and a Juris Doctor from Georgetown University Law Center in 1959. He was a junior management assistant for the United States Department of Labor in Washington, D.C., from 1955 to 1959. He was in private practice in Bismarck, North Dakota from 1959 to 1985, also serving as city commissioner for Bismarck from 1968 to 1976, and as a member of the North Dakota House of Representatives from 1976 to 1985.

Federal judicial service

On October 16, 1985, Conmy was nominated by President Ronald Reagan to a seat on the United States District Court for the District of North Dakota vacated by Judge Bruce Van Sickle. Conmy was confirmed by the United States Senate on December 16, 1985, and received his commission on December 17, 1985. He served as Chief Judge from 1985 to 1992, and assumed senior status on January 5, 2000.

References

Sources
 

1934 births
Living people
Politicians from Fargo, North Dakota
Members of the North Dakota House of Representatives
Harvard College alumni
Georgetown University Law Center alumni
Judges of the United States District Court for the District of North Dakota
United States district court judges appointed by Ronald Reagan
20th-century American judges
Lawyers from Fargo, North Dakota
21st-century American judges